Loch of Stanefield is a small loch of southern-central Whalsay, Shetland Islands, Scotland. It is located to the northeast of the Loch of Livister, west of Nuckro Water, and east of Little Water.

References

Stanefield